The following is a timeline of the history of the city of Orlando, Florida, United States.

19th century

 1843 - Orlando settled as "Jernigan"
 1875
 Town of Orlando incorporated.
 William Jackson Brack becomes mayor.
 1878 - Orange County Reporter newspaper begins publication.
 1880
 South Florida Railroad begins operating.
 Mount Zion Missionary Baptist Church established.
 1884 - Orange County Jail built.
 1886
 Orlando Black (school) opens.
 Orlando Street Railway begins operating (approximate date).
 English Club formed.
 1889 - Church Street Station built.
 1891 - St. James Cathedral built.
 1892
 Courthouse built.
 Lake Eola Park established.
 1900 - Florida Christian Recorder newspaper begins publication.

20th century

1900s-1960s
 1905 - City Hall built.
 1910 - Population: 3,894.
 1913 - Grand Theater opens.
 1914 - Commission form of government effected.
 1918 - Orange General Hospital opens.
 1920 - Population: 9,282.
 1921 
 Beacham Theater opens.
 Jones High School active.
 1923
 Orlando Utilities Commission established; municipal electric plant begins operating.
 Albertson Public Library opens.
 Angebilt Hotel opened on March 14.
 1924
 Edgewater Heights, Lorna Doone Park, and Orwin Manor become part of Orlando.
 WDBO radio begins broadcasting.
 Orlando Museum of Art founded.
 Orange Court Hotel built.
 1925 - Glendonjo Park and Spring Lake Terrace become part of Orlando.
 1926
 Country Club Estates, Ivanhoe Plaza, Oakhurst Subdivision, Orlando Highlands, Princeton Court, and Silver Lake Park become part of Orlando.
 Atlantic Coast Line Railroad station, Cathedral Church of St. Luke, and Municipal Auditorium built.
 Well'sbuilt Hotel in business.
 1927 - Orange County Courthouse built.
 1928 - Orlando Municipal Airport begins operating.
 1930 - Population: 27,330.
 1934 - Orlando Dixie Sun newspaper begins publication.
 1936
 Orlando Stadium opens.
 Cypress Gardens opens in nearby Winter Haven.
 1940 - Orlando Army Air Base established.
 1943
 Pinecastle Army Airfield in operation.
 DDT pesticide "Neocide" developed in United States Department of Agriculture lab in Orlando.
 1945 - Negro Chamber of Commerce established.
 1946 - Ben White Raceway opens.
 1949 - Gatorland opens.
 1950 - Population: 52,367.
 1952 - William R. Boone High School and Edgewater High School are built.
 1954
 WDBO-TV (television) begins broadcasting.
 Bishop Moore High School built.
 1956 - Colonial Plaza shopping centre in business.
 1957
 Orange County Historical Commission established.
 Martin Company missile manufactory begins operating near Orlando.
 Interstate 4 highway constructed.
 1958 - WLOF-TV (television) begins broadcasting.
 1960
 Central Florida Museum opens.
 Population: 88,135.
 1961 - Harry P. Leu Gardens deeded to city.
 1967
 Carl T. Langford becomes mayor of Orlando.
 Disney-controlled City of Bay Lake and City of Reedy Creek incorporated near Orlando.
1963
 UCF opens in East Orlando 
 1968
 Florida Technological University opens.
 Naval Training Center Orlando and Roman Catholic Diocese of Orlando established.

1970s-1990s
 1970
 Lake Highland Preparatory School founded.
 Population: 99,006 city; 344,311 county.
 University Drive-In cinema built.
 1971
 Disney World in business.
 Historical Society of Central Florida headquartered in Orlando.
 1973
 Orlando Fashion Square Mall opens
 Sentinel Star newspaper began publication.
 SeaWorld theme park in business.
 1974 
 East-West Expressway constructed.
 Disney's Discovery Island in business.
 1975 - Metropolitan Orlando Women's Political Caucus and Orlando Lutheran Academy founded.
 1976 - Orlando International Airport in operation.
 1977
 Orlando Regional Medical Center established.
 Wet 'n Wild Orlando theme park in business.
 1979
 Orlando Opera incorporated.
 Basilica of Mary (church) built.
 1980
 July: Racial unrest.
 Bill Frederick becomes mayor.
 Population: 128,291 city; 471,016 county.
 1981 - Bill McCollum becomes U.S. representative for Florida's 5th congressional district.
 1982
 Second Harvest Food Bank of Central Florida established.
Epcot theme park in business in nearby Lake Buena Vista.
 1983 - Orange County Convention Center opens.
 1984 - Orlando Science Center active.
 1986 - The Peabody Orlando hotel and Disney's Living Seas in business.
 1987 - Dr. Phillips High School opens.
 1989 - Orlando-UCF Shakespeare Festival begins.
 Orlando Arena (later the Amway Arena) opens.
 Orlando Magic begin play.
 1990
 Universal Orlando theme park in business.
 Orlando Weekly newspaper begins publication.
 Population: 164,693 city; 677,491 county.
 Zora Neale Hurston Festival begins in nearby Eatonville.
 1991
 UCF Arena opens.
 Orlando Predators football team formed.
 1992
 Cypress Creek High School and Orlando Philharmonic Orchestra established.
 Orlando International Fringe Theater Festival begins.
 1993
 Naval Air Warfare Center Training Systems Division in operation.
 Glenda Hood becomes mayor.
 1994
 June–July: Some 1994 FIFA World Cup games held in Orlando.
 Mormon temple built.
 1996 - City website online (approximate date).
 1998
 Muvico Pointe cinema in business.
 Mennello Museum opens.
 Disney's Animal Kingdom theme park in business.
 1999 - Cinemark Festival Bay Mall (cinema) in business.

21st century

 2001 - Olympia High School established
 2002 - Millenia Mall in business.
 2003
 Freedom High School established.
 Buddy Dyer becomes mayor.
 2004 - Hurricane Charley directly strikes Orlando area with wind gusts to at least 105 mph   Over 60% of Orlando loses power.
 2007 - CFE Arena opens.
 2010
 Amway Center event venue opens.
 Orlando City Soccer Club formed.
 Population: 238,300.
 2011 - Daniel Webster becomes U.S. representative for Florida's 8th congressional district.
 2015
 Orlando Eye ferris wheel built.
 Population: 270,917 (estimate).
 2016 - Orlando nightclub shooting
 2017 - Universal's Volcano Bay in business

See also
 Orlando history
 List of mayors of Orlando, Florida
 List of amusement parks in Greater Orlando
 Timelines of other cities in the Central Florida area of Florida:  Clearwater, Lakeland, Largo, St. Petersburg, Tampa

References

Bibliography

 
 
 
 
 
 
 E. Bacon. 1977. Orlando: A centennial history. Chuluota, Fla.: Mickler House.
 L. Argrett Jr. 1991. A history of the black community of Orlando, Florida. Fort Bragg, Calif.: Cypress House Press.
 
 
 Married to the Mouse: Walt Disney World and Orlando. By Richard E. Foglesong. (New Haven: Yale University Press, 2001).

External links

 Items related to Orlando, various dates (via Digital Public Library of America)

 
orlando
Orlando, Florida-related lists